How Bout Us is the debut studio album by American rhythm and blues group Champaign, released in 1981 via Columbia Records. The album peaked at number 53 on the Billboard 200; and its single of the same name peaked at number 12 on the Billboard Hot 100.

Track listing

Charts

Weekly charts

Year-end charts

References

External links
 

1981 debut albums
Albums produced by Leo Graham (songwriter)
Champaign (band) albums
Columbia Records albums